Vanderbeken is a Belgian surname. Notable people with the surname include:

 Caroline Vanderbeken (born 1950), Belgian chess master
 Jamie Vanderbeken (born 1987), British-Canadian professional basketball player
 Joyce Vanderbeken (born 1984), Belgian female cyclo-cross cyclist

Breton-language surnames